Ali Ardekani (born October 11, 1974), best known by his stage name Baba Ali, is an Iranian-born American comedian, games developer, businessman, and actor.

Early life
Although born into a Persian family, Ardekani was raised in a secular irreligious household in Los Angeles. From the age of 18 he studied many religions including wicca. At the age of 20, Ardekani converted to Islam after attending an Islamic camp.

He belonged to a wealthy family who did not accept his conversion to Islam, and subsequently disinherited him.

Career
Ardekani worked in the IT field in California He and Mahdi Ahmad founded Ummah Films, a Muslim film company which provides Halal (Islamically permissible) entertainment to Muslims and non-Muslims. In 2006, Ardekani rose to prominence within the online Muslim community with Ummah Films, which discusses various Islamic topics using humor. The company has produced several web series, including The Reminder Series and Ask Baba Ali.

Ardekani has appeared on the Islam Channel and he has become a frequent guest at various Muslim conferences and events including the ICNA-MAS convention, Evening of Inspiration, the Global Peace and Unity Event and MuslimFest.

Ardekani has also designed two board games. In 2005, he designed Mecca to Medina, a board game about trading and negotiating with an Islamic-theme that can be played by all religions. Seven people invested $18,000 and made a 24% profit. In 2010, he designed Kalimaat, a word game in the same genre as Taboo, about common knowledge and memory.

In 2011, Ardekani founded Muslim matrimonial website, Half Our Deen.

Ardekani has traveled the world doing stand-up to a wide range of Muslim and non-Muslim audiences. He has performed over 400 events across the world including the United States, United Kingdom, and Canada for audiences as large as 40,000. His work has been reviewed in The New York Times, USA Today and Los Angeles Times as well as featuring in seven episodes of DirecTV's The Fizz News.

In 2015, he starred alongside Omar Regan in the comedy film American Sharia.

Comedy style
Ardekani avoids grandstanding and politicizing issues by simply telling it like it is. However, instead of mocking Islam, he uses a comical approach, without using any offensive material.

His sharp-witted style takes a realistic look at the everyday issues Muslims are confronted with, including being a Muslim teen in America, attending Muslim weddings, and dealing with cultural issues that have impacted Muslims.

Videography

Personal life
In 2001, Ardekani was married. He lives in Los Angeles with his wife and two children. His studio is the second bedroom of the apartment.

See also
Islamic humour
Iranian American
List of Iranian Americans

References

External links

Ummah Films
Ummah Films on Twitter
Hurray For Baba Ali website
Kalimaat website
Half Our Deen website
Milo Productions Inc. website
The Muslim Funnymentalists website
Tareq. Interview: Ali Ardekani (Baba Ali). Product Muslims. March 25, 2010
Hossain, Raakin. Interview: Baba Ali / Ali Ardekani. SalaamCal. October 23, 2012

Living people
1974 births
American Muslims
Iranian emigrants to the United States
Converts to Islam
YouTubers from California
Iranian stand-up comedians
American male comedians
American stand-up comedians
Muslim male comedians
American media executives
Video bloggers
Iranian people in the video game industry
American game designers
Board game designers
American music managers
Iranian businesspeople
21st-century Iranian male actors
Iranian male film actors
American male film actors
21st-century American businesspeople
Businesspeople from California
Comedians from California
Male actors from Tehran
Male actors from Greater Los Angeles
People from Sherman Oaks, Los Angeles
21st-century American comedians
American male bloggers
American bloggers
YouTube vloggers
Comedy YouTubers
Commentary YouTubers